Flagon Point is a point surmounted by two peaks,  and  high, marking the south side of the entrance to Schott Inlet, on the east coast of Palmer Land. It was discovered and photographed from the air in December 1940 by members of the United States Antarctic Service. It was charted in 1947 by a joint party consisting of members of the Ronne Antarctic Research Expedition and the Falkland Islands Dependencies Survey (FIDS), and was so named by the FIDS because the two peaks are suggestive of a flagon tilted on its side when viewed from north or south.

References 

Headlands of Palmer Land